"Holdin' On to Yesterday" is the debut single by American rock band Ambrosia. It was written by David Pack and Joe Puerta.

Chart performance
The song was released in the spring of 1975 as the lead single from their eponymous debut album, peaking at No. 17 on the U.S. Billboard Hot 100. It was also a top 40 hit in Canada and New Zealand.

Personnel
David Pack - lead vocal, guitar
Christopher North - organ, pianos, backing vocal
Joe Puerta - bass, backing vocal
Burleigh Drummond - drums, backing vocal
Daniel Kobialka - violin

References

External links
 

1975 songs
1975 debut singles
Ambrosia (band) songs
20th Century Fox Records singles
Songs written by David Pack